Fulati Gidali (1911 – 22 August 2019) was an Indian folk singer who was known as the "Shaitol Empress".

Biography
Fulati Gidali was born in 1911. She sang "Shaitol" (A type of folk song from Cooch Bihar, West Bengal, India). For her contribution to this arena she was awarded Academy Award by Rabindra Bharati University in 2010. Then she received Banga Ratna from West Bengal Government in 2013. She died on 22 August 2019 at the age of 108.

References

1911 births
2019 deaths
Bengali singers
Indian centenarians
Indian women folk singers
People from Cooch Behar district
Women centenarians
Singers from West Bengal